Heinrich Wilhelm Herbert Wohlfarth (5 June 1915 – 13 August 1982) was a German naval officer and U-boat commander during World War II. He was also a recipient of the Knight's Cross of the Iron Cross. The Knight's Cross of the Iron Cross was awarded to recognise extreme battlefield bravery or successful military leadership.

Naval career
Herbert Wohlfarth began his naval career in April 1933. After the usual training that he spent more than a year on the cruiser . In May 1937, he joined the U-boat force, and like many of the later successful commanders received a solid pre-war training under Karl Dönitz.

On his first three patrols he sank nine mostly smaller ships in Scottish and Norwegian waters. The fourth patrol with U-14 was for him, as for most other commanders during Operation Hartmut, supporting the invasion of Norway, without success.

On 15 June 1940 Wohlfarth commissioned , also a Type IIB boat, referred to as Einbaum (dugout canoe). But these small boats were also very successful and other well-known commanders including Hardegen, Kretschmer and Lüth won their first successes in them.

Wohlfarth led U-137 on three patrols during the autumn of 1940. Especially notable was his torpedo hit on the 10,552-ton armed merchant cruiser , damaging the ship so badly that she had to spend six months in the shipyard for repairs.

On 15 December 1940 Kapitänleutnant Wohlfarth left U-137 and two months later commissioned the Type VIIC boat .

On 15 May 1941 he received the Knight's Cross while still on patrol. On 26 May, during the return voyage, and ten days before his 26th birthday, Wohlfahrt responded to a call for all U-boats in the Bay of Biscay to support the 's increasingly deteriorating position. The aircraft carrier , battlecruiser  and battleship  had a lucky escape during the night, unaware they had come within firing range of Wohlfarth's U-556, which had already fired off all its torpedoes. This was particularly galling for Wohlfahrt, as U-556 and Bismarck had exercised together in the Baltic, and as Wohlfarth had jokingly created a Certificate of Sponsorship, promising to protect the Bismarck. U-556 continued to shadow the British forces, reporting their position and guiding other U-boats to the area. Wohlfarth witnessed the night battles between Bismarck and British destroyers.

Prisoner of war
He and most of his crew were captured; one officer and four men were killed.

Wohlfarth then spent more than six years in English and Canadian prisoner of war camps. His war record stood at 21 ships sunk, totalling , and three more damaged, totalling . He returned to Germany on 14 July 1947.

Wohlfarth died on 13 August 1982 in Villingen, Germany, at the age of 67 years.

Promotions 
 Fähnrich zur See on 1 July 1934
 Oberfähnrich zur See on 1 April 1936
 Leutnant zur See on 1 October 1936
 Oberleutnant zur See on 1 June 1938
 Kapitänleutnant on 1 October 1940

Decorations 
 Dienstauszeichnung 4th Class (31 March 1937)
 Iron Cross (1939)
 2nd Class (6 October 1939)
 1st Class (1 October 1940)
 Sudetenland Medal (20 December 1939)
 U-boat War Badge (1939) (20 December 1939)
 Knight's Cross of the Iron Cross on 15 May 1941 as Kapitänleutnant and commander of U-556
 War Merit Cross (Italy) (1 November 1941)

U-boat Commands 

References

Citations

Bibliography

External links 
 

1915 births
1982 deaths
U-boat commanders (Kriegsmarine)
Recipients of the Knight's Cross of the Iron Cross
Recipients of the War Merit Cross (Italy)
German prisoners of war in World War II held by the United Kingdom
People from Kanazawa, Ishikawa
Reichsmarine personnel
Military personnel from Ishikawa Prefecture
German expatriates in Japan